James Schwebach (August 15, 1847 – June 6, 1921) was a Luxembourgian-born prelate of the Roman Catholic Church who served as Bishop of the Diocese of La Crosse in Wisconsin from 1892 until his death in 1921.

Biography

Early life and education
James Schwebach was born on August 15, 1847, at Platen in the Préizerdaul commune of the Grand Duchy of Luxembourg, to Nicholas Joseph and Margaret (née Busch) Schwebach. He received his early education from private tutors, and afterwards studied at the college of Diekirch for two years. 

In 1864, Schwebach immigrated to the United States, where he entered St. Francis Seminary in Milwaukee, Wisconsin. He there completed his studies in philosophy and theology in five years.  At age 21, being too young for ordination to the priesthood, Schwebach was called to La Crosse and was there ordained a deacon by Bishop Michael Heiss on July 24, 1869. He then served at St. Mary's Parish in La Crosse, where he preached in English, French, and German and taught at the parochial school.

Priesthood and ministry
Schwebach was ordained a priest for the Diocese of La Crosse by Bishop Thomas Grace on June 16, 1870. He then served as pastor of St. Mary's for 22 years, during which time he erected a new church, school, and rectory. He also built St. James the Less Parish in 1887. In addition to his pastoral duties, Schwebach served as vicar general of the diocese from 1882 to 1892.

Bishop of La Crosse
On December 14, 1891, Schwebach was appointed the third bishop of the Diocese of La Crosse by Pope Leo XIII. He received his episcopal consecration on February 25, 1892, from Archbishop Frederick Katzer, with Bishops John Janssen and Joseph Cotter serving as co-consecrators. During his 29-year tenure, he became known as a builder and founded St. Michael's Home for orphans.

James Schwebach died in La Crosse on June 6, 1921, at age 73. He is buried at the Cathedral of St. Joseph the Workman in La Crosse.

See also

 Catholic Church hierarchy
 Catholic Church in the United States
 Historical list of the Catholic bishops of the United States
 List of Catholic bishops of the United States
 Lists of patriarchs, archbishops, and bishops

References

External links
Roman Catholic Diocese of La Crosse

Roman Catholic bishops of La Crosse
Luxembourgian Roman Catholic priests
Luxembourgian emigrants to the United States
19th-century Roman Catholic bishops in the United States
20th-century Roman Catholic bishops in the United States
1847 births
1921 deaths